The 1995 Singha Thailand Classic was a professional ranking snooker tournament that took place between 30 September to 7 October 1995 at the Riverside Montien Hotel in Bangkok, Thailand.

John Parrott won the tournament, defeating Nigel Bond 9–6 in the final. The defending champion Alan McManus was eliminated by John Higgins in the last 16 round.

Prize money
The breakdown of prize money for this year is shown below:

Winner: £40,000
Runner-up: £22,500
Semi-final: £11,250
Quarter-final: £6,250
Last 16: £3,125
Last 32: £2,075

Pre-televised highest break: £4,000
Televised highest break: £5,000

Total: £230,000

Wildcard round

Main draw

References

Dubai Classic
1995 in snooker
1995 in Thai sport
Snooker in Thailand
Sports competitions in Bangkok